Ropica formosana is a species of beetle in the family Cerambycidae. It was described by Henry Walter Bates in 1866. It contains four subspecies, Ropica formosana formosana, Ropica formosana japonica, Ropica formosana nobuoi, and Ropica formosana tokaraensis.

References

formosana
Beetles described in 1866